"I'm Tryin'" is a song written by Jeffrey Steele, Chris Wallin, and Anthony Smith and recorded by American country music artist Trace Adkins.  It released in July 2001 as the lead-off single from his album Chrome.  It peaked at number 6 on the Billboard Hot Country Songs charts.

Content
"I'm Tryin'" is a mid-tempo narrated by a man who has been divorced for two years and is facing troubles in his life, such as working double shifts just to make enough money to pay alimony to his ex-wife. In the chorus, the man expresses his struggles.

The song is composed in the key of A flat major. Jeffrey Steele, Anthony Smith, and Chris Wallin composed the song during a writing session in which they also wrote "3 Seconds" for Sammy Kershaw and Lorrie Morgan. Steele suggested the central premise of the song, and then the other two added lines until they felt the song was completed. Steele told the blog The Boot in 2020 that he came up with the opening line "This gettin' up early, pullin' double shifts / Gonna make an old man of me long before I ever get rich", while Wallin suggested the next line in which the narrator is revealed to be recently divorced. Steele also described the song as "very Beatles-ish".

Music video
The music video was directed by Steven Goldmann, and was filmed in Toronto.

Personnel
Compiled from liner notes.
 Mike Brignardello — bass guitar
 Eric Darken — percussion
 Paul Franklin — steel guitar
 Dann Huff — electric guitar
 B. James Lowry — acoustic guitar
 Brent Mason — electric guitar
 Steve Nathan — keyboards
 Russell Terrell — background vocals
 Lonnie Wilson — drums
 Jonathan Yudkin — violin, cello, mandocello

Chart positions
"I'm Tryin'" debuted at number 58 on the U.S. Billboard Hot Country Singles & Tracks for the week of July 7, 2001.

Year-end charts

References

2001 singles
2001 songs
Trace Adkins songs
Capitol Records Nashville singles
Music videos directed by Steven Goldmann
Song recordings produced by Dann Huff
Songs written by Jeffrey Steele
Songs written by Anthony Smith (singer)
Songs written by Chris Wallin
Songs about divorce